Milan Nikolić  (6 June 1929 – 25 August 2015) was a Serbian professional football player and manager.

Nikolić played abroad for LASK Linz, Rapid Wien, PSV Eindhoven and Willem II Tilburg.

He later coached PSV Eindhoven, 1. FC Saarbrücken, Wormatia Worms, TuS Neuendorf, FC Luzern, and VfR Neumünster.

Honours

Player
Rapid Wien
Austrian League: 1955–56

References

1929 births
2015 deaths
Yugoslav footballers
Association football midfielders
LASK players
SK Rapid Wien players
PSV Eindhoven players
Willem II (football club) players
Eredivisie players
Serbian football managers
Serbian expatriate football managers
Eredivisie managers
PSV Eindhoven managers
1. FC Saarbrücken managers
FC Luzern managers
Wormatia Worms managers
TuS Koblenz managers
Yugoslav expatriate footballers
Expatriate football managers in the Netherlands
Expatriate football managers in Germany
Expatriate football managers in Switzerland